Georges Gope-Fenepej (born 23 October 1988) is a New Caledonian professional footballer who plays as a striker for  club Concarneau. He is the brother of fellow footballer John Gope-Fenepej.

Club career
Gope-Fenepej started his senior career in New Caledonia with AS Kirkitr before moving to AS Magenta in 2011.

On 29 June 2012, he signed a one-year contract with French outfit Troyes AC, newly promoted to French Ligue 1. On 2 February 2013 he made his Ligue 1 debut as a stoppage time substitute in the 1–1 draw at Lille. He scored his first senior goal for the club in a 4–0 Ligue 2 victory at Gazélec Ajaccio on 29 August 2014, his only league appearance for the club that season.

In October 2014, Gope-Fenepej joined Boulogne on loan until the end of the 2014–15 season, in order to get more game time.

Returning to Troyes, Gope-Fenepej was limited to appearances for the B team during the early parts of the 2015–16 season, and in November 2015 he secured a move to Amiens SC in the Championnat National. He was a part of the Amiens team which won back-to-back promotions from Championnat National to Ligue 1 in 2015–16 and 2016–17.

In July 2018, Gope-Fenepej returned to the Championnat National with Le Mans. He again won promotion at the end of the season.

International career
He participated in his first tournament for the New Caledonia national team at the 2011 Pacific Games where he scored seven goals as New Caledonia retained their title.

Career statistics

International goals
Scores and results list New Caledonia's goal tally first.

Honours
Amiens
Ligue 2 runner-up: 2016–17

New Caledonia
Pacific Games: 2011
OFC Nations Cup runner-up: 2012

References

External links
 
 

1988 births
Living people
People from the Loyalty Islands
Association football forwards
New Caledonia international footballers
New Caledonian footballers
Ligue 1 players
Ligue 2 players
Championnat National players
AS Magenta players
US Boulogne players
ES Troyes AC players
Amiens SC players
Le Mans FC players
US Concarneau players
2012 OFC Nations Cup players
2016 OFC Nations Cup players